Cities Development Initiative for Asia (CDIA) is a multi-donor trust fund managed by the Asian Development Bank. As a project preparation facility, we help secondary cities develop bankable and sustainable infrastructure projects.

History 
On February 5–6, 2007, more than 190 representatives from national and local governments of 23 countries, as well as civil society, private sector, international organizations, and donors attended the International Conference on "Investing in Asia's Urban Future" in Manila, Philippines to determine how new approaches can be used to better the lives of 1.6 billion people in Asian cities.

From this event, the Cities Development Initiative for Asia (CDIA) was co-founded initially as a partnership between the Asian Development Bank (ADB) and the German Federal Ministry for Economic Cooperation and Development (BMZ) in October 2007.

Since that time, the program has welcomed the participation of others as funding members:

2008 - The Government of Sweden
2009 - The Government of Switzerland
2011 - The Government of Austria
2011 - The Shanghai Municipal Government

Members 

 Asian Development Bank (ADB)
 French Development Agency (AFD)
 European Union
 German Federal Ministry for Economic Cooperation and Development (BMZ)
 Swedish International Development Cooperation Agency
 Ministry of Finance, Austria
 The Government of Spain
 State Secretariat for Economic Affairs (Switzerland)
 The Shanghai Municipal Government

Partners 

United Nations Economic and Social Commission for Asia and the Pacific
Ministry of Foreign Affairs (Singapore)
United Nations Human Settlements Programme
ICLEI

References

External links 
 Official website: http://www.cdia.asia

Cities in Asia
Urban development
Organizations based in Manila